Phinda Private Game Reserve, formerly known as Phinda Resource Reserve, is a  private game reserve situated in KwaZulu-Natal, South Africa, between the Mkuze Game Reserve and the Greater St. Lucia Wetland Park. Designated in 1991, Phinda is a Zulu word meaning 'return', or more accurately 'repeat'. Phinda has seven distinct ecosystems ranging from palm savannah and mountain bush to rare sand forest and dense thornveld. In 1993 the reserve joined with two neighboring land owners to create the Mun-Ya-Wana Conservancy. As of May 2020, the South African company WildEarth have broadcast drives from Phinda in collaboration with &Beyond.

Fauna
Wildlife inhabiting this reserve include elephant, giraffe, zebra, lion, African wild dog, blue wildebeest, Cape buffalo, hippopotamus, southern white rhinoceros, black rhinoceros, spotted hyena, cheetah and leopard.

Lodges 
Forest Lodge – sixteen stilted glass chalets . These chalets are hand built by local Zulu people to minimize impact on the rare Sand Forest. They seem to float between the forest floor and the towering torchwood trees.
Mountain Lodge – twenty chalets and conference facilities situated at the top of a lavish bushveld world, with panoramas of the Lebombo Mountains and the Lake St. Lucia coastal plains.
Vlei Lodge – six stilted suites of thatch, teak and glass overlook Phinda's unique wetland system at the edge of the forest.
Rock Lodge – six chalets built into the rock face overlooking the Leopard Rock.
Zuka Lodge – situated in the western region of Phinda are four thatched Zululand bush cottages. The cottages are set 15 metres apart and feature verandas overlooking a busy waterhole.
Homestead – an exclusive use 4 bedroom villa.

See also
 List of conservation areas of South Africa
 Wildlife of South Africa

References

External links 

 Official website of Phinda Private Game Reserve
 andBeyond
 Map of Phinda Private Game Reserve

Tourism in South Africa
Protected areas of KwaZulu-Natal
Tourist attractions in KwaZulu-Natal